In Hindu philosophy, Jagra is one of the four states of consciousness a man (or a being) can have. It can be roughly translated as "wakefulness". It is that part of consciousness when a person or being can sense this physical universe. Other states of consciousness are swapna, susupti and turiya. Later commentators increased the states of consciousness from four to seven.

Hindu philosophical concepts